Florin Daniel Lazăr (born 15 January 1980) is a Romanian former football player who played as a centre back.

Club career
Lazăr played at youth level for CSȘ Craiova, a club from his hometown specialized in this sector. Despite the fact that most of local players eventually reached the Craiova's strongest team at that time, FC Universitatea Craiova, he made a big jump to one of the best Romanian football clubs, Dinamo București, for which he made his debut at only 16 years old in a match against Universitatea Cluj. Subsequently, he was loan to Liga II teams as Rocar București or ARO Câmpulung. In 2000 Lazăr signed a contract with Bihor Oradea for which he played in 6 years more than 100 matches succeeding also a historical promotion to the Liga I in 2003. Later he played for teams such as: Oțelul Galați, Gaz Metan Mediaș or Brașov. With Gaz Metan he played in the UEFA Europa League. Lazăr moved back to Bihor Oradea for the last part of his career, being a highly appreciated player by supporters, especially for his style of playing, seriousness and loyalty to the club, also being the captain of the team.

At 35 years old, also due to bankruptcy of FC Bihor, Lazăr left the team, but continued to play for Liga IV teams from Bihor County such as: FC Hidișelu de Sus, CS Diosig or CSC Sânmartin, winning the league with the first two and being on the 1st place with CSC Sânmartin, also, before he transferred to Crișul Chișineu Criș, in January 2018.

Personal life
Born in Craiova, Lazăr had a great time during his career at FC Bihor in the early 2000s, including a historical promotion to the Liga I with the red and blues. He said that he always felt the best in Oradea, settling there.

References

External links
 
 
 Florin Lazăr at frf-ajf.ro

1980 births
Living people
Sportspeople from Craiova
Romanian footballers
Association football defenders
Liga I players
Liga II players
FC Dinamo București players
AFC Rocar București players
FC Bihor Oradea players
ASC Oțelul Galați players
CS Gaz Metan Mediaș players
FC Brașov (1936) players